Events from the 1500s in Denmark.

Incumbents
 Monarch — King John
 Steward of the Realm — Poul Laxmand, until 1502

Events
1500
 17 February  The Danish troops are defeated in the Battle of Hemmingstedt.

1502
 Tyge Krabbe succeeds Eskil Gøye as Marshal of the Realm

Births

 August 12 1503 – Christian III, King of Denmark and Norway (died 1559)
 1503 – Hans Svaning, historian (died 1584)
 1503 – Peder Palladius, bishop (died 1560)
 1 August 1504 – Dorothea of Denmark, Duchess of Prussia (died 1547 in Germany)

Deaths
1506
 20 April  Eskil Gøye, Marshal of the Realm and landowner

References

 
Denmark
Years of the 16th century in Denmark